Csenge Hajduch (born 3 October 1990) is a Hungarian handballer who plays for Budaörs Handball in right back position. She has also been capped for the Hungarian junior national team.

Achievements
 Magyar Kupa:
 Silver Medalist: 2012
 Bronze Medalist: 2010

External links
 Csenge Hajduch player profile on Békéscsabai Előre NKSE Official Website
 Csenge Hajduch career statistics at Worldhandball

References

1990 births
Living people
People from Békéscsaba
Hungarian female handball players
Békéscsabai Előre NKSE players
Fehérvár KC players
Sportspeople from Békés County